London Spirit were formed in 2019, and played their first Hundred match in the 2021 season of The Hundred against Birmingham Phoenix for both the Men's side and the Women's side. Hundred matches are classed as Twenty20 matches and so have Twenty20 status or Women's Twenty20 status. The players in this list have all played at least one Hundred match for the London Spirit Men's or Women's side.

Players are listed in order of appearance, where players made their debut in the same match, they are ordered by batting order.  Players in Bold were overseas players for the London Spirit.

Key

List of players

Men's players

Women's players

See also
 London Spirit
 The Hundred

References

London Spirit

London Spirit
London sport-related lists